Dinesh Singh may refer to:

Dinesh Singh (academic), former Vice Chancellor of University of Delhi
Dinesh Singh (politician) (1925–1995), Indian politician and former Minister of External Affairs of India
Dinesh Singh (Punjab politician) (born 1962), Indian politician and Deputy Speaker of Punjab Legislative Assembly 
Dinesh Singh (footballer) (born 1989), Indian footballer 
Dinesh Prasad Singh (born 1959), Indian politician and member of the Bihar Legislative Council
Dinesh Kumar Singh, Indian politician
Dinesh Pratap Singh (born 1967), Indian politician